
The Hortus deliciarum (Latin for Garden of Delights) was a medieval manuscript compiled by Herrad of Landsberg at the Hohenburg Abbey in Alsace, better known today as Mont Sainte-Odile.

Description
The Hortus deliciarum is one of the first sources of polyphony originating from a convent. The manuscript contained at least 20 song texts, all of which were originally notated with music. Those that can be recognized now are from the conductus repertory, and are mainly note against note in texture. The notation was in semi-quadratic neumes with pairs of four-line staves. Two songs survive with music intact: Primus parens hominum, a monophonic song, and a two-part work, Sol oritur occasus.

History and content
It was an illuminated encyclopedia, begun in 1167 as a pedagogical tool for young novices at the convent. It is the first encyclopedia that was evidently written by a woman. It was finished in 1185, and was one of the most celebrated illuminated manuscripts of the period. The majority of the work is in Latin, with glosses in German. 

Most of the manuscript was not original, but a compendium of 12th-century knowledge. The manuscript contained poems, illustrations, and music, and drew from texts by classical and Arab writers. Interspersed with writings from other sources were poems by Herrad, addressed to the nuns, almost all of which were set to music. The most famous portion of the manuscript are its 336 illustrations, which symbolised various themes, including theological, philosophical, and literary. These works are well regarded. 

In 1870, the manuscript was burnt and destroyed when the library housing it in Strasbourg was bombed during the German Siege of Strasbourg. It is possible to reconstruct parts of the manuscript because portions of it had been copied in various sources; Christian Maurice Engelhardt copied the miniatures in 1818, and the text was copied and published by Straub and Keller between 1879 and 1899.

References

Citations

Sources

Further reading

 Rosalie Green, Michael Evans, Christine Bischoff, and Michael Curschmann(ed.) (1979) The Hortus Deliciarum of Herrad of Hohenbourg (Landsberg, 1176-96): A Reconstruction. Warburg Institute/E.J. Brill
 Fiona J. Griffiths (2007) The Garden of Delights: Reform and Renaissance for Women in the Twelfth Century. Philadelphia: University of Pennsylvania Press.

External links 

 Folio selections in online catalog Oberlin college (folios 322v, 323r, Seven Liberal Arts - 32r, Genealogy of Christ - 80v, Leviathan- 84r, Psycomachia Vices - 200v, Psycomachia Virtues - 201r, Avarice - 203v, Mercy/Charity - 204r, Ladder of Virtues - 216r)
 12 plates taken from the 1818 Engelhardt facsimile formerly online at Museum of Alsace (Web Archive copy retrieved 10-28-2012)

1185 books
12th-century illuminated manuscripts
German encyclopedias
Latin encyclopedias
Lost documents
Medieval European encyclopedias
Scientific illuminated manuscripts